"Famous Last Words of a Fool" is a song written by Dean Dillon and Rex Huston, and recorded by American country music artist George Strait. It was released in January 1988 as the first single from his album If You Ain't Lovin', You Ain't Livin'.

The song was originally recorded by Dillon, whose version peaked at number 67 on Billboard's Hot Country Singles & Tracks chart in 1983.

Critical reception
Kevin John Coyne of Country Universe gave the song a B− grade, calling it "a solid song, but Strait’s performance is oddly distant, and he sings it in a register that’s slightly too low."

Chart performance

Dean Dillon

George Strait

Year-end charts

References

1983 singles
1988 singles
1983 songs
Dean Dillon songs
George Strait songs
Songs written by Dean Dillon
Song recordings produced by Jimmy Bowen
MCA Records singles